Modesto "Cachito" Bria (8 March 1922 – 30 August 1996) was a Paraguayan football midfielder and manager.

Honours

Club
Nacional
Primera División: 1942

Flamengo
Campeonato Carioca: 1943, 1944, 1953

References

1922 births
Paraguayan footballers
Paraguayan expatriate footballers
Club Nacional footballers
CR Flamengo footballers
CR Flamengo managers
Expatriate footballers in Brazil
Expatriate football managers in Brazil
1996 deaths
Association football midfielders
Paraguayan football managers